United States Department of Defense Police (or DoD Police) are the uniformed civilian police officers of the United States Department of Defense, various branches of the United States Armed Forces (such as the Department of the Navy), or specific DoD activities (Defense Logistics Agency Police).

The DoD Police are responsible for law enforcement and security services on DoD owned and leased buildings, facilities, properties and other DoD assets.

It is important to note that "Department of Defense Police" is a catch-all phrase that refers to any civilian engaged in police duties for the Department of Defense and its component branches of the US Armed Forces.

Examples

Pentagon Police
There is a DoD police agency based at the Pentagon named the United States Pentagon Police, which is part of the Pentagon Force Protection Agency. Formerly the Defense Protective Service (DPS), the Pentagon Police have exclusive jurisdiction within the Pentagon Reservation and have concurrent jurisdiction with other police agencies (state, county, and local) in an area of approximately  around the complex. Through a memorandum of understanding (MOU) with Arlington County, U.S. Pentagon Police Officers also possess authority, to enforce laws while on duty in Arlington County, Alexandria, the District of Columbia, and various other areas throughout the National Capital Region.See  10 USC 2674, and 10 USC 2672(C)

Memorandums of understanding
Memorandums of understanding (MOUs) are established in agreement with either the City Police Chief, or the local Sheriff vary with every DoD facility.

DoD Police facilities that have MOU agreements include DoD Police in San Francisco, California,  the Los Angeles Air Force Base DoD Police in southern California, NAWS China Lake in Ridgecrest, California, and the DOD Police at the Norfolk Naval Station in Norfolk, Virginia.

Similar to the aforementioned Pentagon Police, the DoD Police (specifically, Department of the Air Force Police) stationed on Hanscom Air Force Base in Eastern Massachusetts maintain a MOU with multiple historically significant towns (Bedford, Lincoln, Concord, and Lexington).

DoD Officers

Hiring
A DoD police officer is assigned the federal occupational series code (Civil Service Series) "0083", the code reserved for police.

This occupational series code applies regardless of what specific agency of the Department of Defense the officer works for.

Individual installations conduct the hiring process based upon local need, thus a person applying for a DoD police officer positions applies to specific installations.

Most installations have detectives, which can share the same "0083" occupational series code as police officers or "1811" series as criminal investigators.
These detectives investigate misdemeanor or felony crimes; however, felony crimes are investigated on a case-by-case basis that are not pursued by the special agent of each branches' investigative agency (such as NCIS, CID, or OSI).

Duties
DoD Police perform a variety of law enforcement and security roles.

One major function of a DoD Police officer is to conduct law enforcement and force protection duties. This often takes the form of ensuring that only authorized personnel access the installation by performing identification checks at fixed entry control points (ECP). Officers at fixed posts ensure that all entry requirements have been met before allowing an individual to proceed.

DoD Police officers also conduct patrols within the installation and other federal properties. An officer can conduct traffic stops for any motor vehicle violations.

Each jurisdiction adopts the surrounding state's motor vehicle laws under the Assimilative Crimes Act (see Federal Jurisdiction). There are two types of citations that may be issued: the DD Form 1408 Armed Forces Traffic Ticket and the CVB Form (U.S. District Court Violation Notice).

 The DD Form 1408 does not have any monetary fines associated with it and is an administrative type of punishment or can be used as a written warning. 
 The CVB Form (USDCVN), however, carries a monetary fine or requires a mandatory appearance in U.S. District Court.

All monies collected from tickets written by agencies that partake in the CVB program are deposited in the Victims of Crime Fund established by US Congress under the Victims of Crime Act of 1984.

DoD Police officers also respond to all calls for law enforcement assistance or service that take place within or surrounding the installations and federal property. If the crime is found to be a major felony, then the matter is generally referred to the special agents of the applicable investigative agency (NCIS, Army CID, OSI, FBI, etc.).

Specialization
There are specialized roles within DoD Police, such as:

K-9, 
Traffic Investigations, 
Civil Liaison/AWOL Apprehension, 
game warden, 
bike patrol, 
harbor patrol, 
flight line patrol
special response team (SRT).

Off-duty carry
On January 2, 2013 President Obama signed into law H.R. 4310 which clarifies in section 1089 that DoD civilian police are qualified law enforcement officers and may legally carry concealed weapons across the nation.

Requirements of potential DoD officers
Actual recruitment requirements vary between service branches, agencies, and installations. There are, however, a few hiring requirements that are nearly universal among DoD Police services.

A major requirement of any potential DoD officer is to pass a medical exam. While there is not typically an uncorrected vision requirement, candidates must have normal color vision, depth perception, and sufficiently good corrected vision.

For certain assignments DoD police officers are required to obtain and maintain a "Secret" security clearance. The background investigation must show the candidate to be free of substantial debt or foreign influence. Under the Lautenberg Amendment, DoD police officers cannot have any convictions for domestic violence. Law Enforcement Departments also require an interview with the candidate.

Candidates can be required to take and pass a physical fitness test. This test could take the form of the same type of test that is issued to military members (as in the case of Department of the Army officers) or the so-called Illinois Agility Test, a type of obstacle course (as in the case of some Department of the Navy officers).  Some installations require officers pass this test annually, something not typically required of local municipal police officers (though these officers are often required to take one in their respective academies). There is a great deal of protocol variance between installations on the issue of the physical fitness test.

Whether or not a candidate has to attend a DoD academy (see "Training" section below) depends on both the installation and the prior law enforcement experience of the applying individual. A candidate transferring from another agency who has attended any state certified or federal (FLETC) academy is occasionally excused from attending a DoD academy.CINC 5530.14

Training
DoD agencies, including Pentagon Police and Defense Logistics Agency Police, send their officers to the Federal Law Enforcement Training Center (FLETC) certified academies in Glynco, Georgia.

DoD Police training outside of the Department of Defense itself may or may not be standardized and each military service (Coast Guard or US Air Force, US Marine Corps) may choose other academies and/or training regiments that satisfy their needs and requirements.

Army
The Army hosts its own Academy which is FLETA certified as the Department of the Army Civilian Police Academy at Fort Leonard Wood, and is used by DLA and other DOD Agencies at times. The Department of Veterans Affairs Law Enforcement Training Center (LETC) often serves as a training program that is able and willing to meet the training requirements for DoD Officers and their respective installations.

Air Force
Officers of the Department of the Air Force Police attend a 10-week training academy (formerly 6 weeks) at the Department of Veterans Affairs Law Enforcement Training Center (LETC) in Little Rock, Arkansas as well. This is an Air Force-specific course that does not certify officers to work on Veteran's Administration properties, only Air Force installations.

There are also various specialized government and private entities that supply specialized training to DoD Officers on an as needed basis. Some DOD Police Officers have concurrent jurisdiction, meaning they can enforce state laws off base and the city police can enforce state laws on the base.

Navy

Marine Corps

DoD Security
DOD Security Officers (GS-0085) (often known as "Guards" (e.g. Department of Army Guard or "DASG") are not federal police officers, but do hold federal grades, wear similar uniforms and carry firearms. Their duties are mostly access control

Training
Guards are often trained at their location, rather than a central training facility like the GS-0083 police officers.

Equipment

DoD Police officers wear typical police style uniforms, more often than not in a shade of dark "L.A.P.D." blue. Pentagon Police wear a grey police uniform.  Many installations now issue solid blue or black BDUs/TDUs for officers with cloth badges and name tapes. Badges and patches vary widely between agencies and installations.

DoD officers carry a firearm, typically a M9 Beretta, spare ammunition, pepper spray, a police baton (typically an expandable ASP), a taser, handcuffs, radio, latex gloves, and other commonly seen police equipment. Bulletproof vests are also issued. During higher threat conditions, officers could be equipped with Kevlar helmets and other protective equipment; along with rifles, carbines, and shotguns.

DoD police vehicles vary widely, with vehicles ranging from Chevrolet Silverados, Chevrolet Tahoes, Ford Explorers, Dodge Chargers. However, most installations and agencies use the Chevrolet Impala or Ford Police Interceptor. Vehicles may be marked or unmarked and utilize emergency blue and red lights and sirens.  Some vehicles are equipped with cages for prisoner transport, but not all.

See also

 List of United States federal law enforcement agencies
 United States Department of Defense
 United States Pentagon Police
 Department of the Army Civilian Police
 Department of the Air Force Police
 Department of the Navy Police
 United States Marine Corps Civilian Police
 Ministry of Defence Police – perform a similar role in the United Kingdom.

References

External links
 UCMJ
 (Search the US Code)
 (Navy LE Program)
 (Army Civilian Police Program)
 (USMC LE Program) - archive copy

Federal law enforcement agencies of the United States
United States Department of Defense agencies
Agency-specific police departments of the United States
Civilian police forces of defense ministries